María Candelaria "Cande" Molfese (born 3 January 1991) is an Argentine actress, singer and television host who gained global fame for her role in the Disney Channel Latin America television series Violetta.

Early life 
Molfese was born and raised in Buenos Aires and is the youngest child of five daughters. Her parents are divorced. Her father later remarried and resides in Mexico City, where she often visits and regards as her second home.

Acting career 
In 2010, Molfese had a role in the Argentine children's musical, Juntas y Revueltas. Performances were held in Buenos Aires.

She discovered information about auditions for the Argentine Disney tween musical television series Violetta via a website. Following a successful casting process, she was confirmed in late 2011 as a cast member for Violetta, which was co-produced by Disney Channel Latin America and the Argentine production company, Pol-ka. Filming for season one began in September 2011 in Buenos Aires. The series premiered on 12 May 2012 and aired globally in markets for three seasons. She also participated as a vocalist on the show's albums and as a performer in the two international concert tours: "Violetta en vivo" and "Violetta Live 2015 International Tour", held during breaks from filming the series. Molfese concluded filming the last season of Violetta during the final months of 2014 where production was held in Buenos Aires and Sevilla, Spain.

2016–present 
In November 2016, she was announced as a cast member of the Argentine comedy-drama telenovela, "Quiero vivir a tu lado". The telenovela filmed in Buenos Aires and later premiered in Argentina in January 2017 on El Trece. In 2017, Molfese returned to Disney Channel, where she co-starred in season 2 and 3 of the Argentine telenovela tween musical series, Soy Luna as "Ada"."

In February 2019, Molfese was confirmed as a cast member in the musical-drama play, La Llamada, based on the popular Spanish play of the same name. The play will premiere on 2 May 2019 in Buenos Aires. Molfese will play the lead role, "María Casados"."

Other ventures 
On 15 November 2015, Molfese released her first book, Mundo Cande, featuring details about her family, beauty tips, and food-related content. As part of a promotional tour, she held a signing in Warsaw for the book's launch in late January 2016. The book has been published in Spanish and Polish. In late spring 2016, Molfese joined the cast of the popular Argentine teen-oriented web series, Fans en vivo, as a co-hostess, replacing former hostess, Jenny Martinez. Her debut episode with the series aired on 30 May 2016. The program films live in Buenos Aires every Monday, Wednesday, and Thursday and is available for streaming. Previously, Molfese worked on the website, "FWTV", as the host her own travel video blog, documenting the "Violetta" tours, and on separate cooking and lifestyle video series.

In August 2016, she starred in the Upload Project campaign with StandWithUs, and Israeli non-profit organization, together with Sheryl Rubio, toured the cities of Tel Aviv and Jerusalem for a few days; the project aims to promote tourism in Israel,

In late 2018, she hosted the backstage, web series, #LadoV ("Side V" in English), for the reality singing competition, La Voz Argentina.

Filmography

Theatre

Discography

Violetta soundtracks

Tours 
 2013–2014: "Violetta en vivo" (as principal cast member)
 2015: "Violetta Live International" (as principal cast member)

Awards and nominations

Personal life 
Molfese resides in Buenos Aires. She maintains a close friendship with her former "Violetta" co-stars, Clara Alonso, Alba Rico Navarro and Lodovica Comello; both appeared on her YouTube blogging series, and her personal YouTube channel. Molfese is a vegetarian and often shares recipes with fans through her social media platforms.

She was in a relationship with actor Ruggero Pasquarelli from 2014 to 2020.

References

External links 

 Official website/blog

1991 births
Living people
Actresses from Buenos Aires
Argentine female dancers
21st-century Argentine women singers
Argentine television actresses
Singers from Buenos Aires